Charley Looney is an American former Negro league second baseman who played in the 1930s.

Looney played for the Akron Black Tyrites in 1933. In nine recorded games, he posted eight hits in 39 plate appearances.

References

External links
 and Baseball-Reference Black Baseball Stats and Seamheads

Year of birth missing
Place of birth missing
Akron Black Tyrites players
Baseball second basemen